Korea is a 1995 Irish feature film directed by Cathal Black and produced by Darryl Collins based on a short story by John McGahern. In 1996 Korea won the Asta Nielsen Best Film Award at the Copenhagen Film Festival and was runner-up for the Audience Prize at the Seattle Film Festival.

Plot
A story of the relationship between father and son, John and Eamon Doyle. Based on a short story by John McGahern, it is set in rural Ireland during the 50s, a period of mass emigration and social change. Young Irish emigrants, on arriving in America, have been enlisted and sent to fight in the Korean war. One of those emigrants, Luke Moran, dies in Korea and his home village is awash with rumours about the compensation the Moran family received on Luke's death. John Doyle hears the rumours but remains silent. Ben Moran is John's arch-enemy, a feud traced back to the Civil War. Eamon comforts and falls in love with Una Moran.

References

External links

English-language Irish films
1995 films
1990s English-language films